The 1987 Eastern Province massacres were a series of massacres of the Sinhalese population in the Eastern Province of Sri Lanka by Tamil mobs and Liberation Tigers of Tamil Eelam  during the Sri Lankan Civil War. Over 200 Sinhalese were killed by mob and militant  violence, and over 20,000 fled the Eastern Province. The violence has been described as having had the appearance of a pogrom.

Background
The Eastern province was a highly contested zone between the Sinhalese and Tamils. Since the 1930s, the majority Sinhalese government settled Sinhalese in the Eastern province, with the explicit intention to restore what they saw as lost ancient Sinhala settlements, as well as to reduce the Tamils' claim to local autonomy. Tamil nationalists viewed this as an attempt to alter the demographics of their 'traditional Tamil homeland', thus weakening the Tamils' stake in it. 

During the 1983 riots, Trincomalee was the site of anti-Tamil violence at the hands of Sinhalese sailors. During 1985 massacres, there was widespread, systematic destruction of Tamil villages and massacres in Trincomalee District, by the Sri Lankan Army with the help of Sinhalese settlers nearly destroying the Trincomalee Town and displacing its population. Following this, there had been a series of massacres of Sinhalese by Tamil militants and Tamils by the Army and home guards in the Trincomalee District that continued into 1986.

The year 1987 saw notorious violent incidents against Sinhalese civilians by the LTTE in or near the Eastern Province. On April 17, an LTTE unit had waylaid a bus carrying southbound Sinhalese from Trincomalee at Aluth Oya and massacred them. The week after, the village of Jayantipura near Kantale was attacked and over 15 Sinhalese were killed. On June 2, an LTTE unit massacred Buddhist monks and other Sinhalese civilians in Aranthalawa.

In July 1987, India sent the IPKF to the island as part of an attempt to negotiate a political solution between the Government of Sri Lanka and the Tamil militant groups. The Indo-Sri Lanka Accord was signed on 29 July 1987, and one of its terms was that the Sri Lankan security forces would be confined to their barracks in the north and east. Sinhalese settlers were also disarmed.

In late September 1987, Thileepan began a hunger strike. On the 21st of September, a scuffle broke out between a Tamil group of 'satyagrahis' who gathered in support of Thileepan and a Sinhalese group at the Anuradhapura Junction in Trincomalee. Ethnic violence had begun where the Sinhalese and Tamils were both perpetrators and victims. On September 24, Sinhalese from Mihindupura had left in bullock carts; the next morning, the carts returned without them and 9 charred bodies were found with a burnt cart. The LTTE was suspected to have perpetrated the killings. Thileepan eventually died from his hunger strike, inviting grief from the Tamil community. Around the same time, the IPKF had nominated members for the Interim Council of the North and East, a majority of them being LTTE representatives.

Incident

Trincomalee riots
After the Interim Council was announced to be mostly LTTE nominees, anti-Sinhalese violence flared in Trincomalee, an ethnically heterogeneous city, on September 29. On September 30, 2 Tamils were found hacked to death; in retaliation, a Tamil group killed 3 Sinhalese men in a truck. The violence became more organized on October 1, with LTTE members leading rioters and warning Sinhalese to evacuate their homes lest they be killed. In Trincomalee and throughout the Eastern Province, properties were set on fire, and over 2,000 people, mostly Sinhalese, were rendered homeless. In Trincomalee, Tamil rioters, with the help of militant leaders, brutally killed Sinhalese men and raped Sinhalese women. A Sinhalese truck driver was burnt to death along with his truck and an elderly Sinhalese man was beaten to death. Sinhalese had been burned in their homes, and Sinhalese patients had been thrown out of the hospital, killing some. Around 50 Sinhalese who were well established in the community had been killed in the area of the main Sinhalese school. Corpses were thrown into wells that were covered up. The IPKF prevented any intervention by the Sri Lankan Army. They fired at a crowd of Sinhalese gathered at the King's Hotel Junction, killing one. At J. R. Jayawardene's request, the IPKF had 11 platoons come into Trincomalee to restore order. On October 4, the IPKF shot a Sinhalese Buddhist monk who had demonstrated against them. On the same day, the IPKF had attacked Abeypura, a Sinhalese colony near Trincomalee. The Indian soldiers engaged in assault, arson, and murder of the Sinhalese in the colony.

Militant action
Following the suicide of the 11 Tamil Tigers in Sri Lankan police custody on October 5, Tamil militant violence spread throughout the Eastern Province. In Batticaloa, Sinhalese who had long coexisted amicably with Tamils, since the state-sponsored Sinhala colonisation began, had been attacked, even upsetting some LTTE leaders. According to Batticaloa residents, the family of a Sinhalese taxi driver had been killed by an LTTE member called Niranjan Kingsley, and a Sinhalese goldsmith had been murdered by two brothers named Dayalan and Puruchotan. Sinhalese and Muslims were massacred in buses, trains, and villages in various regions in the Eastern province. At least 40 people were killed in the train. One massacre in Kiran was masterminded by an LTTE leader named Devi. As in Trincomalee, the IPKF did little to prevent the violence and in some cases appeared to be supporting the militants. Sinhalese refugees specifically accused the Madrasi regiment of the IPKF, composed of Tamils, of complicity in violence against them. The Sri Lankan military was still prevented from protecting the Sinhalese. When one Sinhalese man from Mihindupura attempted to inform the Sri Lankan military of an assault on the village, the Indian soldiers would not allow them through, and the man was even assaulted by an Indian soldier. By the end of the violence, over 200 Sinhalese civilians were estimated to be dead, and 20,000 were made refugees. The actual number of dead may be higher as some people disappeared and their fates were unknown.

References 

1987 in Sri Lanka
1987 riots
Massacres in 1987
Massacres in Sri Lanka
Ethnic riots
Human rights abuses in Sri Lanka
October 1987 events in Asia
Riots and civil disorder in Sri Lanka
September 1987 events in Asia
Mass murder of Sinhalese
Indian Peace Keeping Force